Forest Rangers F.C. is a football club from Ndola, Zambia currently playing in the top flight Zambian Premier League.

History
In 1975, Forest Rangers Football Club started as Community Football Team at Dola Hill Forest Station in Ndola and joined the Ndola District Amateur League in 1976. After a period of 3 years, the club was promoted to Division 3 under the Copper belt Amateur League up to the end of the 1988 soccer season. The club played Division 1 football from 1989 to 1991.

During the 1991 soccer season, the club finished as runners up in the independence Cup Competition after losing 5-1 to the then Football kings of Zambia, Nkana Football Club. This was after the club had eliminated Mufulira Wanderers in the semi-final by a lone goal at Nkana Stadium. At the end of the same soccer season, the club won promotion to the Super league Division.

The club stayed in the Super League Division up to the end of the 1994 soccer. During the 1994 season, the club finished among the top eight clubs of the Super League Division.

In 1995, the sponsors (ZAFFICO Limited) under the cost saving measures policy disbanded the team.

In 1998, the team was revamped through social football. In 1999, the team merged with strike Rovers Football club and played Division 1 Football under the club name of Forest Strikes Football Club up to 2000.

In 2001, the club retained the name of Forest Rangers Football Club when ZAFFICO limited became the sole sponsors of the club.

The club's Premier League Football performance since 2002 has been as follows:

 2002	Played Super League Football
 2003	Played Division 1 Football
 2004 	Played Super League Football
 2005 	Played Division 1 Football
 2006 	Played Super League Football and finished among the top eight
 2007 	Played Super League Football
 2008	Played Super Division 1 Football
 2009	Played Super League Football and finished among the top eight
 2010    Played Super League football
 2011	Played Super League Football
 2012	Played Super League Football
 2013	Played Super League and got relegated to Division 1 Football
 2014	Played Division 1.Won the League and promotion to Super League Football
 2020 FAZ Super league second runner up and qualified for CAF Champions league 2020/2021 season. This was the first time the Club had finished as second runners up since 1975 and qualified for CAF Champions league for 2020/2021 season. The Club lost the title to Nkana Football Club on goal difference. The most successive Club Management in the History of the Club included:
Benhail Mukuka ( President)
Chota Ngalande ( Vice President)
Wisdom Musonda ( Vice Secretary)
Blessings Siame ( Treasurer)
      
Forest Rangers Football Club has been very instrumental in football talent identification and development through urban and rural football. So far, the club has produced the following notable players:

 1993 – 2001	Kellies Mwamba Musole Sakulanda, Joe Kabemba, Aston Mbewe and John Mubanga
 2002 to date	Felix Katongo, Nyambe Mulenga, Zebron Njovu, Nasha Kaya, Osward Kalamba,  Sebastian Mwansa, Lwipa Juma, Floyd Phiri, Daudi Musekwa, Christopher Musonda, Kelvin Kanyenga, Allan Chibwe, Frazer Mwewa, Prince Mubita, Bizwell phiri, Michael Phiri and Kennedy Chansa Mpoya, Walter Bwalya Binene Sabwa, Dieugo Apanane, Fred Tshimenga, and George Stama.

Team profile

 Nickname		:	Fole Malembe
 Formed			:	1975
 Sponsors			:Zambia Forestry and Forest industries Corporation 
 Team colours		:	Green and yellow
 Home ground		:	Levy Mwanawasa Stadium
 Local league honours	:	Nil
 Local cup honours	:	F
 1991	Independence Cup runners up
 2005	Coca-Cola Cup Champions
 2006	Charity shield runners up
 2006	Coca-Cola Cup runners up
2020 Second runners up and qualified for CAF Champions league.

Colors

Traditionally, the club has always worn yellow and green home kits, with green and white as their away and third colors respectively.

Achievements
Zambian Coca-Cola Cup: 1
2005
FAZ MTN Super league  Second runners up 2020

CAF Champions league 2020/2021 Qualifiers

First-team squad

References

Football clubs in Zambia
Ndola
Forest Rangers F.C.
Forest Rangers Football Club Facebook page